Gilberto Jesus "Gilbertico" Mendoza (born December 25, 1970) is a Panamanian sports administrator. Mendoza is, since December of 2015, the president of the Panama based World Boxing Association, which is, along with the United States based International Boxing Federation, the Mexico based World Boxing Council and the Puerto Rico based World Boxing Organization, one of the four major international boxing championship recognizing groups.

WBA president
On May 28, 2021, it was announced that Mendoza had been reelected as president of the WBA for the period from 2021 to 2025.

Personal
Mendoza is the son of the previous WBA president, Gilberto Mendoza.

See also
Mauricio Sulaiman
List of Panamanians

External links

1970 births
Living people